Mayuzumi (written: 黛) is a Japanese surname. Notable people with the surname include:

, Japanese singer
, Japanese composer

Fictional characters
, a character in the visual novel Maji de Watashi ni Koi Shinasai!

Japanese-language surnames